In the early hours of August 13, 2018, in Frederick, Colorado, American oil field operator Christopher Lee Watts (born May 16, 1985) murdered his pregnant wife Shanann (34) by strangulation, and their two children Bella (4) and Celeste (3) by smothering them. He buried Shanann in a shallow grave near an oil-storage facility, and dumped his children's bodies into crude oil tanks. Watts initially maintained his innocence in his family’s disappearance, but was arrested on August 15 after confessing to murdering Shanann in an interview with detectives. He later admitted to murdering his children.

On November 6, 2018, Watts pleaded guilty to multiple counts of first-degree murder as part of a plea deal when the death penalty (which was later abolished in Colorado in 2020) was removed from sentencing. He was sentenced to five life sentences without the possibility of parole, three to be served consecutively.

Background
Christopher Lee Watts and Shanann Cathryn Watts (née Rzucek, January 10, 1984 – August 13, 2018) were from North Carolina: Christopher from Spring Lake and Shanann from Aberdeen. They met in 2010 and were married in Mecklenburg County on November 3, 2012, according to online records. The couple had two daughters: Bella Marie Watts (December 17, 2013 – August 13, 2018) and Celeste Cathryn "CeCe" Watts (July 17, 2015 – August 13, 2018). At the time of her death, Shanann was 15 weeks pregnant with a son who was to be named Nico.

The Watts family lived in a five-bedroom home at 2825 Saratoga Trail in Frederick, Colorado, which they purchased in 2013, and declared bankruptcy in 2015. Christopher was employed by Anadarko Petroleum, while Shanann worked from home selling a product called Thrive for the multi-level marketing company Le-Vel.

Disappearance
At approximately 1:48 am on Monday, August 13, 2018, Shanann, returning from a business trip to Arizona, was driven home by her friend and colleague Nickole Utoft Atkinson. Over that weekend Watts was home with their daughters. Later that day, Shanann and the girls were reported missing by Atkinson, who became concerned when Shanann missed a scheduled obstetrics and gynecology appointment and failed to return her text messages. After Shanann missed a business meeting, Atkinson went to the Watts residence at about 12:10 pm. When the doorbell and knocks went unanswered, Atkinson notified Christopher, who was at work, and called the Frederick Police Department. 

A Frederick police officer arrived to conduct a welfare check at about 1:40 pm. During the welfare check, Christopher gave the police officer permission to search the house, where the family dog was discovered unharmed, but no sign of Shanann or the girls was found. Searchers discovered Shanann's purse containing her keys and the children's medicine. Her phone was later located between the couch cushions in the family home. Her car, which still contained the girls' car seats, was in the garage. Shanann's wedding ring was found on the bedside table.

The FBI and the Colorado Bureau of Investigation (CBI) joined the investigation the next day. Watts initially told police that he had no idea where his family might be and that he had not seen his wife since 5:15 am the previous day, when he left for work. He gave interviews to Denver stations KMGH-TV and KUSA-TV outside the house, pleading for the return of his wife and daughters. Investigators with search dogs could be heard on the property during the interview.

Legal proceedings

Arrest and charges

Watts was arrested on August 15, 2018. According to the arrest affidavit and footage from a security camera in the interview room, he failed a polygraph test and subsequently confessed to murdering Shanann. He asked to speak to his father before confessing. According to the affidavit, Watts was having an affair and claimed he asked for a separation from Shanann. During the investigation, he claimed Shanann had strangled the girls in response to his request for separation and that he had then strangled her in a fit of rage and transported the bodies to a remote oil-storage site leased by his employer, Anadarko Petroleum.

Watts was fired by the company on August 15, the day of his arrest. The authorities located the bodies of the Watts family on the oil-storage site, situated approximately 3 miles north of Roggen, on August 16. The girls' bodies were found in crude oil storage tanks, while Shanann was buried in a shallow grave nearby. Bella and Celeste's bodies had each been pushed through a hatch at the top of a different oil tank, with the lid being 8 inches in diameter. According to the medical examiner, "Bella had scratches on her left buttock from being shoved through this hole. A tuft of blonde hair was found on the edge of one of these hatches."

On August 21, Watts was charged with three counts of first-degree murder, including an additional one count per child cited as "death of a child who had not yet attained 12 years of age and the defendant was in a position of trust", unlawful termination of a pregnancy, and three counts of tampering with a deceased human body. He was denied bail at his first court appearance. At a later hearing, his bail was set at $5 million, with him being required to put down 15% to be released.

The case has been connected in the media to the crime of family annihilation (familicide). Many of these crimes occur in August, before school starts, which may delay detection and investigation. According to former FBI profiler Candice DeLong, cases such as the Watts' are rare because "family annihilators usually commit suicide after the murders", an action that Watts claimed to have contemplated out of guilt for his actions.

In an interview on Dr. Phil, Watts's lawyer claimed that he confessed to killing Shanann after an argument regarding divorce. During the murder, Bella walked in on the couple. Watts then told her that Shanann was sick. He loaded Shanann's body and the girls, without their car seats, into the back seat of his work truck. He later smothered the girls, one after the other.

Plea deal and sentencing
Watts pleaded guilty to the murders on November 6. The death penalty was not put forward by the district attorney on the request of Shanann's family, who did not wish for any further deaths. They were supportive of his decision to accept the plea deal. On November 19, he was sentenced to five life sentences—three consecutive and two concurrent—without the possibility of parole. He received an additional 48 years for the unlawful termination of Shanann's pregnancy and 36 years for three charges of tampering with a deceased body. His sentence began immediately.

On December 3, 2018, Watts was moved to an out-of-state location due to "security concerns". On December 5, he arrived at Dodge Correctional Institution, a maximum-security prison in Waupun, Wisconsin, to continue serving his life sentences.

Media accounts
On a December 2018 episode of the ABC News series 20/20, Shanann's parents were interviewed for the first time since the murders. HLN aired a special report that same month titled Family Massacre: Chris Watts Exposed, in which footage of Watts from police body cameras and security cameras in the police station's interview room were revealed. In a recorded interview released by the CBI with Christopher's girlfriend, she revealed his behavioral changes in the days prior to the murders.

On a December 2018 episode of the American talk show Dr. Phil, Phil McGraw consulted with four crime experts: former prosecutor and TV journalist Nancy Grace, former FBI profiler Candice DeLong, law enforcement consultant Steve Kardian, and body language expert Susan Constantine. The experts analyzed the motivation, secret life, and profiling of Watts. On a January 2019 episode of the talk show The Dr. Oz Show, commentary is provided on his case by the neighbor who helped build the case against him, who is interviewed in-studio.

In June 2021, Inside Edition reported further confessions from Chris Watts to a pen pal. In multiple letters, Watts explained that he had planned the murder for several weeks and that the oxycontin found in Shanann's system was given to her by him, hoping to end her pregnancy because he believed that would make it easier for him to be with his girlfriend. He also offered new details about the murder of his daughters: he tried to smother them in their beds at home, but failed.

Adaptations
On December 7, 2019, Oxygen released a one hour documentary about the case as the first episode of series three of their television program Criminal Confessions.

On January 26, 2020, Lifetime released a film called Chris Watts: Confessions of a Killer as part of its "Ripped from the Headlines" feature film series. It stars Sean Kleier as Christopher Watts and Ashley Williams as Shanann. Shanann's family spoke out against the film, stating that they had not been consulted about it and were not aware of its making until it was already in production. They have also said they are not making any money from it and fear that it will only increase the harassment online that they had already been receiving.

On September 30, 2020, Netflix released American Murder: The Family Next Door, a documentary about the murders. The documentary features archival footage including home videos, social media posts, text messages, and law enforcement recordings.

In 2022, the true crime band SKYND published a single called "Chris Watts", based on the Watts case.

See also

 Crime in Colorado
 Familicide
 Uxoricide
 Hawe family murders

References

Further reading
 Chris Watts & Shanann Watts murder case – KUSA 9News Denver at YouTube
  – Testimony from the district attorney of Weld County
 
 
 
 
 Responding officer's body camera of the entire investigation, with an explanation of body language read by the officer. YouTube. December 15, 2018.

External links
 The People of the State of Colorado v. Christopher Lee Watts. Documents from August 16, 2018, to November 27, 2018. Colorado Judicial Branch. 
 Press Release: Christopher Lee Watts. Frederick Police Department. August 20, 2018. Archived September 25, 2018.

2018 in Colorado
2018 murders in the United States
August 2018 crimes in the United States
August 2018 events in the United States
Familicides
Incidents of violence against girls
Murder in Colorado
Violence against women in the United States